The , also known as "Yuge-ji", or under the alternative kanji "弓削寺跡", is an archaeological site with the ruins of a Nara period Buddhist temple located in the Higashiyuge neighborhood of the city of Yao, Osaka, Japan. The temple no longer exists, but the temple grounds were designated as a National Historic Site in 2018.

Overview
The temple ruins are located on in former Yuge-go, Wakae-gun, Kawachi Province, which was the ancestral home of the Yuge clan, local gentry whose most famous member was the monk Dōkyō (700-772), the favorite of Empress Shōtoku who made a failed attempt to usurp the  Imperial throne. From the name of the temple, it is assumed that this was the clan temple for the Yuge clan, and the ruins are located near the Yuge Jinja, a Shinto shrine in which the ancestors of the Yuge clan are venerated as kami. The temple appears in documentary literature at the end of 742 AD. It is also mentioned in the Shoku Nihongi in an entry dated 765 AD, in which the Empress Kōken sponsored a memorial service at the temple with a donation of food for 200 families. It reappears in an entry for 770 AD noting the building of a pagoda. The year 770 is significant, as this was the period during which Empress Shōtoku had attempted to make Dōkyō emperor. A new imperial palace, the  had been constructed in Wakae-gun, and the surrounding area had been earmarked for a new capital city,  which was have replaced Heijō-kyō.

The site of Yuge-ji was located in 2016, when a large quantity of roof tiles from the latter half of the Nara period were found. These tiles are identical to those used in the great national temples of Tōdai-ji and Kōfuku-ji.  In subsequent archaeological excavations, the foundations of a pagoda measuring 20 meters on each side were unearthed. This would correspond to a tower on the same scale as Daian-ji in Nara, which was a seven-story tower, and would correspond to a temple sponsored by Dōkyō.  The pagoda was destroyed by fire before the Kamakura period. In August 2017, further foundations of various buildings were found, along with the remains of a canal approximately 500 meters to the northeast of the pagoda foundation. It is believed that this canal was constructed to transport building materials needed to construct the temple. The site was proclaimed a National Historic Site in February 2018.

See also
List of Historic Sites of Japan (Osaka)

References

External links

Yao city home page 

Yao, Osaka
Kawachi Province
Nara period
Historic Sites of Japan
Buddhist archaeological sites in Japan